This is a list of woods,  most commonly used in the timber and lumber trade.

Soft woods (coniferous) 
 Araucaria
Hoop pine (Araucaria cunninghamii)
 Monkey puzzle tree (Araucaria araucana)
 Paraná pine (Araucaria angustifolia)
 Cedar (Cedrus)
 Celery-top pine (Phyllocladus aspleniifolius)
 Cypress (Chamaecyparis, Cupressus, Taxodium)
 Arizona cypress (Cupressus arizonica)
 Bald cypress, southern cypress (Taxodium distichum)
 Alerce (Fitzroya cupressoides)
 Hinoki cypress (Chamaecyparis obtusa)
 Lawson's cypress (Chamaecyparis lawsoniana)
 Mediterranean cypress (Cupressus sempervirens)
 Douglas-fir (Pseudotsuga menziesii)
 Coast Douglas-fir (Pseudotsuga menziesii var. menziesii)
 Rocky Mountain Douglas-fir (Pseudotsuga menziesii var. glauca)
 European yew (Taxus baccata)
 Fir (Abies)
 Balsam fir (Abies balsamea)
 Silver fir (Abies alba)
 Noble fir (Abies procera)
 Pacific silver fir (Abies amabilis)
 Hemlock (Tsuga)
 Eastern hemlock (Tsuga canadensis)
 Mountain hemlock (Tsuga mertensiana)
 Western hemlock (Tsuga heterophylla)
 Huon pine, Macquarie pine (Lagarostrobos franklinii)
 Kauri (New Zealand) (Agathis australis)
 Queensland kauri (Australia) (Agathis robusta)
 Japanese nutmeg-yew, kaya (Torreya nucifera)
 Larch (Larix)
 European larch (Larix decidua)
 Japanese larch (Larix kaempferi)
 Tamarack (Larix laricina)
 Western larch (Larix occidentalis)
 Pine (Pinus)
 European black pine (Pinus nigra)
 Jack pine (Pinus banksiana)
 Lodgepole pine (Pinus contorta)
 Monterey pine (Pinus radiata)
 Ponderosa pine (Pinus ponderosa)
 Red pine (North America) (Pinus resinosa)
 Scots pine, red pine (UK) (Pinus sylvestris)
White pine
 Eastern white pine (Pinus strobus)
 Western white pine (Pinus monticola)
 Sugar pine (Pinus lambertiana)
Southern yellow pine
 Loblolly pine (Pinus taeda)
 Longleaf pine (Pinus palustris)
 Pitch pine (Pinus rigida)
 Shortleaf pine (Pinus echinata)
 Red cedar
 Eastern red cedar, (Juniperus virginiana)
 Western red cedar (Thuja plicata)
 Coast redwood (Sequoia sempervirens)
 Rimu (Dacrydium cupressinum)
 Spruce (Picea)
 Norway spruce (Picea abies)
 Black spruce (Picea mariana)
 Red spruce (Picea rubens)
 Sitka spruce (Picea sitchensis)
 White spruce (Picea glauca)
 Sugi (Cryptomeria japonica)
 White cedar
 Northern white cedar (Thuja occidentalis)
 Atlantic white cedar (Chamaecyparis thyoides)
 Nootka cypress (Cupressus nootkatensis)

Hardwoods (angiosperms) 
 Abachi (Triplochiton scleroxylon)
 Acacia (Acacia sp., Robinia pseudoacacia)
 African padauk (Pterocarpus soyauxii)
 Afzelia, doussi (Afzelia africana)
 Agba, tola (Gossweilerodendron balsamiferum)
 Alder (Alnus)
 Black alder (Alnus glutinosa)
 Red alder (Alnus rubra)
 Ash (Fraxinus)
 Black ash (Fraxinus nigra)
 Blue ash (Fraxinus quadrangulata)
 Common ash (Fraxinus excelsior)
 Green ash (Fraxinus pennsylvanica)
 Oregon ash (Fraxinus latifolia)
 Pumpkin ash (Fraxinus profunda)
 White ash (Fraxinus americana)
 Aspen (Populus)
 Bigtooth aspen (Populus gradidentata)
 European aspen (Populus tremula)
 Quaking aspen (Populus tremuloides)
 Australian red cedar (Toona ciliata)
 Ayan, movingui (Distemonanthus benthamianus)
 Balsa (Ochroma pyramidale)
 Basswood, linden
 American basswood (Tilia americana)
 White basswood (Tilia heterophylla)
American beech (Fagus grandifolia)
 Birch (Betula)
American birches
 Gray birch (Betula populifolia)
 Black birch (Betula nigra)
 Paper birch (Betula papyrifera)
 Sweet birch (Betula lenta)
 Yellow birch (Betula alleghaniensis)
European birches
 Silver birch (Betula pendula)
 Downy birch (Betula pubescens)
 Blackbean (Castanospermum australe)
 Blackwood
 Australian blackwood (Acacia melanoxylon)
 African blackwood, mpingo (Dalbergia melanoxylon)
 Bloodwood (Brosimum rubescens)
 Boxelder (Acer negundo)
 Boxwood, common box (Buxus sempervirens)
Brazilian walnut (Ocotea porosa)
 Brazilwood (Caesalpinia echinata)
 Buckeye, Horse-chestnut (Aesculus)
 Horse-chestnut (Aesculus hippocastanum)
 Ohio buckeye (Aesculus glabra)
 Yellow buckeye (Aesculus flava)
 Butternut (Juglans cinerea)
 California bay laurel (Umbellularia californica)
 Camphor tree (Cinnamomum camphora)
 Cape chestnut (Calodendrum capense)
 Catalpa, catawba (Catalpa)
 Ceylon satinwood (Chloroxylon swietenia)
 Cherry (Prunus)
Black cherry (Prunus serotina)
Red cherry (Prunus pensylvanica)
Wild cherry (Prunus avium)
 Chestnut (Castanea spp.)
 Chestnut (Castanea sativa)
 American Chestnut (Castanea dentata)
 Coachwood (Ceratopetalum apetalum)
 Cocobolo (Dalbergia retusa)
 Corkwood (Leitneria floridana)
 Cottonwood, popular
 Eastern cottonwood (Populus deltoides)
 Swamp cottonwood (Populus heterophylla)
 Cucumbertree (Magnolia acuminata)
 Cumaru (Dipteryx spp.)
 Dogwood (Cornus spp.)
 Flowering dogwood (Cornus florida)
 Pacific dogwood (Cornus nuttallii)
 Ebony (Diospyros)
 Andaman marblewood (Diospyros kurzii)
 Ebène marbre (Diospyros melanida)
 African ebony (Diospyros crassiflora)
 Ceylon ebony (Diospyros ebenum)
 Elm
 American elm (Ulmus americana)
 English elm (Ulmus procera)
 Rock elm (Ulmus thomasii)
 Slippery elm, red elm (Ulmus rubra)
 Wych elm (Ulmus glabra)
 Eucalyptus
 Lyptus: Flooded gum (Eucalyptus grandis)
 White mahogany (Eucalyptus acmenoides)
 Brown mallet (Eucalyptus astringens)
 Banglay, southern mahogany (Eucalyptus botryoides)
 River red gum (Eucalyptus camaldulensis)
 Karri (Eucalyptus diversicolor)
 Blue gum (Eucalyptus globulus)
 Flooded gum, rose gum (Eucalyptus grandis)
 York gum (Eucalyptus loxophleba)
 Jarrah (Eucalyptus marginata)
 Tallowwood (Eucalyptus microcorys)
 Grey ironbark (Eucalyptus paniculata)
 Blackbutt (Eucalyptus pilularis)
 Mountain ash (Eucalyptus regnans)
 Australian oak (Eucalyptus obliqua)
 Alpine ash (Eucalyptus delegatensis)
 Red mahogany (Eucalyptus resinifera)
 Swamp mahogany, swamp messmate (Eucalyptus robusta)
 Sydney blue gum (Eucalyptus saligna)
 Mugga, red ironbark (Eucalyptus sideroxylon)
 Redwood (Eucalyptus transcontinentalis)
 Wandoo (Eucalyptus wandoo)
 European crabapple (Malus sylvestris)
 European pear (Pyrus communis)
 Gonçalo alves (Astronium spp.)
 Greenheart (Chlorocardium rodiei)
 Grenadilla, mpingo (Dalbergia melanoxylon)
 Guanandi (Calophyllum brasiliense)
 Gum (Eucalyptus)
 Gumbo limbo (Bursera simaruba)
 Hackberry (Celtis occidentalis)
 Hickory (Carya)
 Pecan (Carya illinoinensis)
 Pignut hickory (Carya glabra)
 Shagbark hickory (Carya ovata)
 Shellbark hickory (Carya laciniosa)
 Hornbeam (Carpinus spp.)
 American hophornbeam (Ostrya virginiana)
 Ipê (Handroanthus spp.)
 Iroko, African teak (Milicia excelsa)
 Ironwood
 Balau (Shorea spp.)
 American hornbeam (Carpinus caroliniana)
 Sheoak, Polynesian ironwood (Casuarina equisetifolia)
 Giant ironwood (Choricarpia subargentea)
 Diesel tree (Copaifera langsdorffii)
 Borneo ironwood (Eusideroxylon zwageri)
 Lignum vitae
Guaiacwood (Guaiacum officinale)
Holywood (Guaiacum sanctum)
 Takian (Hopea odorata)
 Black ironwood (Krugiodendron ferreum)
 Black ironwood, olive (Olea spp.)
 Lebombo ironwood  Androstachys johnsonii
 Catalina ironwood (Lyonothamnus floribundus)
 Ceylon ironwood (Mesua ferrea)
 Desert ironwood (Olneya tesota)
 Persian ironwood (Parrotia persica)
 Brazilian ironwood, pau ferro (Caesalpinia ferrea)
 Yellow lapacho (Tabebuia serratifolia)
 Jacarandá-boca-de-sapo (Jacaranda brasiliana)
 Jacarandá de Brasil (Dalbergia nigra)
 Jatobá (Hymenaea courbaril)
 Kingwood (Dalbergia cearensis)
 Lacewood
Northern silky oak (Cardwellia sublimis)
American sycamore (Platanus occidentalis)
London plane (Platanus × acerifolia)
 Limba (Terminalia superba)
 Locust
 Black locust (Robinia pseudoacacia)
 Honey locust (Gleditsia triacanthos)
 Mahogany 
 Genuine mahogany (Swietenia)
 West Indies mahogany (Swietenia mahagoni)
 Bigleaf mahogany (Swietenia macrophylla)
 Pacific Coast mahogany (Swietenia humilis)
 other mahogany
 African mahogany (Khaya spp.)
 Chinese mahogany (Toona sinensis)
 Australian red cedar, Indian mahogany (Toona ciliata)
 Philippine mahogany, calantis, kalantis (Toona calantas)
 Indonesian mahogany, suren (Toona sureni)
 Sapele (Entandrophragma cylindricum)
 Sipo, utile (Entandrophragma utile) 
 Tiama, (Entandrophragma angolense)
 Kosipo, (Entandrophragma candollei)
 Mountain mahogany, bottle tree (Entandrophragma caudatumi)
 Indian mahogany, chickrassy, chittagong wood (Chukrasia velutina)
 Spanish Cedar, cedro, Brazilian mahogany (Cedrela odorata)
 Light bosse, pink mahogany (Guarea cedrata)
 Dark bosse, pink Mahogany (Guarea thompsonii)
 American muskwood (Guarea grandifolia)
 Carapa, royal mahogany, demerara mahogany, bastard mahogany, andiroba, crabwood (Carapa guianensis)
 Bead-tree, white cedar, Persian lilac (Melia azedarach)
 Maple (Acer)
 Hard maple
 Sugar maple (Acer saccharum)
 Black maple (Acer nigrum)
 Soft maple
 Boxelder (Acer negundo)
 Red maple (Acer rubrum)
 Silver maple (Acer saccharinum)
 European maple
 Sycamore maple (Acer pseudoplatanus)
 Marblewood (Marmaroxylon racemosum)
 Marri, red gum (Corymbia calophylla)
 Meranti (Shorea spp.)
 Merbau, ipil (Intsia bijuga), Kwila
 Mopane (Colophospermum mopane)
 Oak (Quercus)
 White oak
White oak (Quercus alba)
 Bur oak (Quercus macrocarpa)
 Post oak (Quercus stellata)
 Swamp white oak (Quercus bicolor)
 Southern live oak (Quercus virginiana)
 Swamp chestnut oak (Quercus michauxii)
 Chestnut oak (Quercus prinus)
 Chinkapin oak (Quercus muhlenbergii)
 Canyon live oak (Quercus chrysolepis)
 Overcup oak (Quercus lyrata)
 English oak (Quercus robur)
 Red oak 
 Northern red oak (Quercus rubra)
 Eastern black oak (Quercus velutina)
 Laurel oak (Quercus laurifolia)
 Southern red oak (Quercus falcata)
 Water oak (Quercus nigra)
 Willow oak (Quercus phellos)
 Nuttall's oak (Quercus texana)
 Okoumé (Aucoumea klaineana)
 Olive (Olea europaea)
 Pink ivory (Berchemia zeyheri)
 Poplar
 Balsam poplar (Populus balsamifera)
 Black poplar (Populus nigra)
 Hybrid black poplar (Populus × canadensis)
 Purpleheart (Peltogyne spp.)
 Queensland maple (Flindersia brayleyana)
 Queensland walnut (Endiandra palmerstonii)
 Ramin (Gonystylus spp.)
 Redheart, chakté-coc (Erythroxylon mexicanum)
 Sal (Shorea robusta)
 Sweetgum (Liquidambar styraciflua)
 Sandalwood (Santalum spp.)
 Indian sandalwood (Santalum album)
 Sassafras (Sassafras albidum)
 Southern sassafras (Atherosperma moschatum)
 Satiné, satinwood (Brosimum rubescens)
 Silky oak (Grevillea robusta) 
 Silver wattle (Acacia dealbata)
 Sourwood (Oxydendrum arboreum)
 Spanish-cedar (Cedrela odorata)
 Spanish elm (Cordia alliodora)
 Tamboti (Spirostachys africana)
 Teak (Tectona grandis)
 Philippine teak (Tectona philippinensis)
 Thailand rosewood (Dalbergia cochinchinensis)
 Tupelo (Nyssa spp.)
 Black tupelo (Nyssa sylvatica)
 Tulip tree (Liriodendron tulipifera)
 Turpentine (Syncarpia glomulifera)
 Walnut (Juglans)
 Eastern black walnut (Juglans nigra)
 Common walnut (Juglans regia)
 Wenge (Millettia laurentii)
 Panga-panga (Millettia stuhlmannii)
 Willow (Salix)
 Black willow (Salix nigra)
 Cricket-bat willow (Salix alba 'Caerulea')
 White willow (Salix alba)
 Weeping willow (Salix babylonica)
 Zingana, African zebrawood (Microberlinia brazzavillensis)

Pseudowoods 

Other wood-like materials:
 Bamboo
 Palm tree
 Coconut timber (Cocos nucifera)
 Toddy palm timber (Borassus flabellifer)

See also
Janka hardness test
List of Indian timber trees

References

External links 
 Global Wood Density Database
 National Hardwood and Lumber Association
 American Hardwood Information Center
 American Hardwood Export Council
 Australian National Association of Forest Industries
 Canadian Wood Group
 FSC Lesser Known Timber Species
 NCSU Inside Wood project
 Reproduction of The American Woods: exhibited by actual specimens and with copious explanatory text by Romeyn B. Hough
 US Forest Products Laboratory,  "Characteristics and Availability of Commercially Important Wood" from the Wood Handbook PDF 916K
 International Wood Collectors Society
 Xiloteca Manuel Soler (One of the largest private collection of wood samples)
 African Timber Export Statistics

Woods
Woods
Woodworking materials
Woods
Woods
Woods
Wood types
Wood by type